Lake Bancroft is a lake  located in the city of Ishpeming in the U.S. state of Michigan. The lake has experienced progressive eutrophication resulting in hypoxia, disrupting its natural ecology. The Lake Bancroft Project, appointed by the Ishpeming City Council, aim to reverse the damage caused by eutrophication in a process using a food-grade polymer which binds itself to suspended material then brings it to the bottom of the lake.

See also
List of lakes in Michigan

References

Lakes of Michigan
Lakes of Marquette County, Michigan